Robertson College, Jabalpur, (now divided into Government Science College, Jabalpur and Mahakoshal Arts & Commerce College) is considered to be the oldest such institution in Madhya Pradesh.

History
It was established in 1836 as Sagar Govt. School in Sagar, and was upgraded to Sagar Collegiate School in 1860 by starting F.A. (Fine Art, a degree equivalent to 12th grade) classes. The institution was moved to Jabalpur in 1873. It was renamed Robertson College in honor of the then commissioner Mr. Benjamin Robertson in 1916. Many of the students at Robertson College  joined Hitkarini Sabha institutions during time of Indian independence struggle, where could they participate in the swaraj movement. It was renamed Mahakoshal Mahavidyalaya in 1947 after independence. The college moved to its present and permanent campus in 1947. The former building of Robertson College now houses the Civil engineering department of the Jabalpur Engineering College

Many distinguished scholars have emerged from the Robertson College and its descendant institutions.

References

External links 
 http://www.sciencecollegejbp.org/college.htm (Official website)]

Universities and colleges in Madhya Pradesh
Education in Jabalpur
1836 establishments in India
Arts colleges in India
Commerce colleges in India
Educational institutions established in 1836
Science colleges in India
Law schools in Madhya Pradesh
Engineering colleges in Madhya Pradesh